Sweet Sensation is the fourth album by American R&B and soul singer Stephanie Mills. Released in 1980, produced by James Mtume and Reggie Lucas. The album features her biggest hit, "Never Knew Love Like This Before" which peaked within the top ten of the US Billboard Hot 100 and won two Grammy Awards for Best R&B Vocal Performance, Female and Best R&B Song, the former becoming her first career Grammy win. Sweet Sensation received gold status by the Recording Industry Association of America for sells over 500,000 copies.

Track listing
All songs written by James Mtume and Reggie Lucas except where indicated.

Personnel 
 Stephanie Mills – vocals 
 Hubert Eaves III – keyboards
 James Mtume – keyboards, percussion, backing vocals, rhythm arrangements, vocal arrangements, producer 
 Ed Walsh – synthesizer programming
 Reggie Lucas – guitars, backing vocals, rhythm arrangements, vocal arrangements, producer 
 Ed Moore – guitars
 Basil Fearington – bass guitar
 Howard King – drums
 Gene Blanco – horn and string arrangements
 Wade Marcus – horn and string arrangements
 Tawatha Agee – backing vocals, vocal contractor
 Gwen Guthrie – backing vocals 
 Brenda White King – backing vocals

 Recorded and Mixed at Sigma Sound Studios (New York, NY)
 James Dougherty – engineer, mixing 
 Craig Michaels – assistant engineer 
 Ted Jensen – mastering at Sterling Sound (New York, NY)
 Glen Christensen – art direction, photography 
 Stanley James – make-up, hair stylist

Charts

Weekly charts

Year-end charts

Singles

References

1980 albums
Stephanie Mills albums
Albums arranged by Wade Marcus
20th Century Fox Records albums
Albums recorded at Sigma Sound Studios